The railway vehicle classes covered by this list of DRG locomotives and railbuses  belonged to the Deutsche Reichsbahn-Gesellschaft or DRG (1924–37) and its successor, the Deutsche Reichsbahn or DRB (post 1937).

The DRG (lit. German Imperial Railway Company) was formed under the terms of the Dawes Plan from the Deutsche Reichseisenbahnen (lit. Imperial Railways), a merger of the various German state railways after the First World War. The tables are generally organized in accordance with the DRG's numbering schemes for the various types of vehicles. A brief explanation of this may be found in the articles on the numbering scheme of the German railways and German steam locomotive classification.

After the end of the Second World War the West German part of the DRB became the Deutsche Bundesbahn (DB), but its East German counterpart continued to be called the Deutsche Reichsbahn (DR) – see Deutsche Reichsbahn (East Germany). The DB and the DR later introduced newly built classes into the numbering plans and also reclassified some vehicles following rebuilding. They are not covered here.

Steam locomotives 

The tables contain the steam locomotive classes listed in the DRG's final renumbering plan for state railway locomotives of 1925 and the classes built or rebuilt between 1925 and 1945. The locomotives taken over from private railways as well as the classes given to foreign machines immediately before and during the Second World War are covered for express passenger and passenger tender locomotives only so far.

Express passenger tender locomotives

Passenger tender locomotives

Goods tender locomotives

Passenger tank locomotives

Goods tank locomotives

Rack railway locomotives

Branch line locomotives

Narrow gauge locomotives

Electric locomotives

Diesel locomotives

Electric railbuses

Accumulator railbuses

Steam railbuses

Motor railbuses

References

See also 
 Deutsche Reichsbahn
 Deutsche Reichsbahn-Gesellschaft
 UIC classification

Defunct railway companies of Germany
Deutsche Reichsbahn-Gesellschaft locomotives
Locomotives of Germany
DRG